Gilderdale Halt railway station, also known as Gilderdale railway station, served the town of Alston, Cumbria, England, from 1986 to 1999 on the South Tynedale Railway.

History 
The station was opened in December 1986 on the South Tynedale Railway. It wasn't accessible by road; it was to the north of a farm accommodation. When the line was extended north to Kirkhaugh on 4 September 1999, the station closed. The platform still remains.

References 

Disused railway stations in Cumbria
Railway stations in Great Britain opened in 1986
1986 establishments in England
1999 disestablishments in England